Edgardo Rebosio (born June 28, 1914 in Milan) was an Italian professional football player.

1914 births
Year of death missing
Italian footballers
Serie A players
Inter Milan players
A.C. Monza players
Bassano Virtus 55 S.T. players
Association football defenders
Vigevano Calcio players